Odontocharacidium aphanes, the green dwarf tetra, is a species of South American darter found in the Amazon River basin.  It occurs in the countries of Brazil, Colombia, Peru and Venezuela.  It is the only member of its genus.

References
 

Crenuchidae
Tetras

Freshwater fish of Brazil
Freshwater fish of Colombia
Freshwater fish of Peru
Fish of the Amazon basin
Taxa named by Stanley Howard Weitzman
Fish described in 1977